Parthenodes rectangulalis is a moth in the family Crambidae. It was described by George Hamilton Kenrick in 1907. It is found on New Guinea.

References

Moths described in 1907
Musotiminae